At War is a 2018 French drama film directed by Stéphane Brizé. It was selected to compete for the Palme d'Or at the 2018 Cannes Film Festival.
 The film gained acclaim for its portrayal of working people.

Plot
After promising 1,100 employees that they would protect their jobs, the managers of a French factory that has been bought by Germans, decide to suddenly shut down the plant. Laurent, a worker at the factory, takes the lead in a fight against this decision.

Cast
 Vincent Lindon as Eric Laurent

Reception
The website's critical consensus reads: "At War doesn't have the answers to the struggles it highlights, but proves no less compelling in the raw urgency with which it depicts the modern worker's plight." On Metacritic, the film has a score of 61 out of 100, based on 12 critics, indicating "generally favorable reviews".

References

External links
 
 

2018 films
2018 drama films
2010s French-language films
French drama films
Films directed by Stéphane Brizé
2010s French films